Gino Esposito is a fictional character from the Australian soap opera Neighbours, played by Shane McNamara. The character made his first appearance during the episode broadcast on 11 August 2000. The character was originally played by Claude Stevens. McNamara was cast in the role when the character was reintroduced in 2001. Gino owned a hair salon called A Good Hair Day, which employed both Lyn Scully (Janet Andrewartha) and Janelle Timmins (Nell Feeney). Script producer Luke Devenish called Gino "a [gay] stereotype" and a comedic character, similar to Mr. Humphries from British sitcom Are You Being Served?.

Character development
In 1995, Neighbours introduced a storyline about the bullying of gay teacher, Andrew Watson (Christopher Uhlman). It was a turning point for the show, but it took another five years before another gay male character was introduced. Gino made his first appearance in 2000. He was a hairdresser who owned the local hair salon and spoke about his flatmate Aaron often. It was later revealed that Aaron was his partner. Neighbours script producer, Luke Devenish said of the character, "He is a [gay] stereotype, and we don't have a problem with that as he is not a negative stereotype, he is a comic character and it is for a laugh – in the Mr Humphries [of Are You Being Served] kind of tradition". David Knox of TV Tonight called Gino an "incidental gay male character." When Gino moves in with Harold Bishop (Ian Smith), the writers decided to tweak the "standard love triangle story" with Lou Carpenter (Tom Oliver) becoming jealous of the duo. Harold and Gino get along very well and share a love of musicals. Of this, Peter Mattessi of The Age said "The tension this created between Lou and Harold ("same-sex platonic life-partners", according to Toadie) was a wonderful storytelling twist, and the innuendo made Gino's sexuality clear to those in the know, yet avoided the questions from younger viewers which would jeopardise the G rating."

Storylines
Gino was born Ray Murphy, but he decided to change his name when he became a hairdresser. Gino formed a reputation as a top hairdresser and he decided to open his own hair salon. He bought the A Good Hair Day salon in the Lassiter's Complex in 2001, which concerned Lyn Scully (Janet Andrewartha), who had been managing it for the previous owner. Gino and Lyn were rivals and Lyn began dressing younger as she knew that Gino favoured young, pretty hair stylists. Gino put Lyn on a month's trial to see if she could juggle her family and her commitments to the salon. Lyn quit after Gino started taking her regular clients away from her. Lyn decides to branch out on her own and take Gino's clients with her. When Gino finds out about her plans, he threatens to blacken Lyn's name around the town. Lyn tells Gino that she knows his real name is Ray Murphy. Gino is shocked and does not want his reputation ruined, so he accepts Lyn's resignation. Gino's business suffers without Lyn and he tells her that he made a mistake in mistreating her. Lyn then agrees to come back.

Gino becomes involved in the Erinsborough Amateur Players and asks Joe Scully (Shane Connor) to build him some sets. Both men clash with their different ideas, but eventually come to respect each other. Gino also becomes a wedding planner and Susan Kennedy (Jackie Woodburne) asks him for his help with her second wedding to Karl (Alan Fletcher). Gino's plans are too much for Susan and Karl and when they go to reject them, Gino tells them that his commitments to the Erinsborough Players' mean he cannot commit to the planning the wedding. When Gino falls out with his boyfriend, Aaron (Stewart Adam), Gino discovers that Harold Bishop has a room to rent. Gino and Harold bond over their love of musicals and vegetarian food and Harold invites Gino to move in. Gino later makes up with Aaron and moves back in with him. However, Gino arrives back at Harold's within a few hours of leaving as he and Aaron had fallen out again. Harold tries to get rid of Gino and when he cooks much meat and eats a sausage, although it was vegetarian, in front of him, Gino leaves and goes back to Aaron.

Gino asks Joe if he could be godfather to his and Lyn's son, Oscar (Ingo Dammer-Smith). Gino explains that he will never have kids of his own and his nieces and nephews live too far away. Joe agrees to give it some thought. On the day of Oscar's christening, Joe discovers that Gino has decorated the church and he asks him to be Oscar's fourth godparent. Gino comes between Harold and Lou Carpenter (Tom Oliver) when he and Lou start spending a lot of time together. Harold becomes jealous when Gino and Lou and two girls from the salon go away together and Gino and Lou begin partying with each other. However, both Lou and Harold support Gino when Boyd Hoyland (Kyal Marsh) accuses Gino of trying to come onto him. Gino is left shaken by the incident. He eventually put the incident behind him when Boyd apologises. Gino writes a play about a country boy who arrives in the city dreaming of stardom and he casts Ned Parker (Daniel O'Connor) in the lead role. On the morning of the opening night, Gino injures his back and Karl takes over his duties. Karl also fills in for Ned, after he injures his knee. Following the opening night, no more tickets were sold and Gino's play finished. A few weeks later, Gino announces that he is going to take his baby paegents on tour around Australia and he sells the salon to Steve Parker (Steve Bastoni).

Reception
The Sydney Star Observer said that "at times, Gino has also shown astonishing depth. Like when he was fighting to become godfather to Lyn's baby son Oscar". They said that the situation was something "a lot of gay men can relate to" as Gino explained that he was unlikely to have a child of his own. The newspaper added "We went beyond the froth with him and it was quite moving". Of the character of Gino and his relationship with Harold Bishop, David Knox said "Gino eventually ended up sharing house with Harold, frequently watching musicals on DVD together but never speaking about the love that dare not speak its name..."

References

Neighbours characters
Fictional gay males
Fictional hairdressers
Television characters introduced in 2000
Fictional LGBT characters in television
Male characters in television